Rotary may refer to:

Science, engineering and technology
 Rotary motion
 Rotary dial, a rotating telephone dial
 Rotary engine (disambiguation), multiple types of engines called "rotary"
 Rotary latch
 Rotary milking shed, a type of milking shed used in the dairy industry
 Rotary snowplow, one type of railroad snowplow used especially for deep snow removal
 Rotary system, a type of pre-electronic telephone switch
 Rotary table (drilling rig), a device used to apply directional force to a drill string
 Rotary tiller, a motorised cultivator
 Rotary woofer, a type of loudspeaker capable of producing very low frequency sound
 Rotary wing aircraft

Organisations and enterprises
 Rotary International, or Rotary Club, an international service organization founded in the United States 
 Rotary Foundation, non-profit foundation of Rotary International
 Rotary Scholarships, scholarships offered by the organization 
 Rotary Watches, a Swiss watchmaker

Other uses
 Rotary (intersection) or roundabout, a circular roadway intersection
 "The Rotary", a song by Andy Partridge from Take Away / The Lure of Salvage